Ervin Lázár (May 5, 1936 – December 22, 2006) was a Hungarian author. Although he wrote a novel (A fehér tigris (The White Tiger), 1971)  and a number of short stories, he is best known for his tales and stories for children.

Bibliography
This is a list of books written by Ervin Lázár, with literal translations of their titles:

A kisfiú meg az oroszlánok (1964, The Little Boy and the Lions)
Csonkacsütörtök (1966, Short Thursday)
Egy lapát szén Nellikének (1969, A Shovel-full of Coal for Nelli)
Buddha szomorú (1973, Buddha Is Sad)
A fehér tigris (novel, 1971, The White Tiger)
A Hétfejű Tündér (children's stories, 1973, The Seven-Headed Fairy)
Berzsián és Dideki (children's stories, 1979, Berzsián and Dideki)
Gyere haza, Mikkamakka (children's novel, 1980, Come Home, Mikkimakka)
A Masoko Köztársaság (1981, The Masoko Republic)
Szegény Dzsoni és Árnika (children's story, 1981, Poor Dzsoni and Árnika)
A négyszögletű kerek erdő (children's novel, 1985, The Square Circular Wood)
Bab Berci kalandjai (children's novel, 1989, The Adventures of Berci Bab)
A Franka cirkusz (radio stories, 1990, The Franka Circus)
A manógyár (children's stories, 1994, The Dwarf Factory)
Hét szeretőm (short stories, 1994, My Seven Lovers)
Csillagmajor (short stories, 1996, Csillag Manor)
Kisangyal (short stories, 1997, Little Angel)
Hapci király (short stories, 1998, King Atishoo)
Lehel kürtje (short stories, Lehel's Horn)

References

Hungarian writers
1936 births
2006 deaths
Deaths from respiratory failure
Hungarian children's writers